Posyolok 2-go uchastka instituta imeni Dokuchayeva is a rural locality (a settlement) and the administrative center of Kamenno-Stepnoye Rural Settlement, Talovsky District, Voronezh Oblast, Russia. The population was 264 as of 2010. There are 19 streets.

Geography 
It is located 12 km south of Talovaya (the district's administrative centre) by road. Posyolok 3-go uchastka instituta imeni Dokuchayeva is the nearest rural locality.

References 

Rural localities in Talovsky District